Eupetomena is a genus in the hummingbird family Trochilidae. It contains two species which are both found in eastern South America.

Taxonomy
The genus Eupetomena was introduced in 1853 by the English ornithologist John Gould to accommodate a single species, the swallow-tailed hummingbird which therefore becomes the type species. The genus name combines the Ancient Greek eu meaning "good" and petomenos meaning "always on the
wing" or "flying" (from petomai "to fly").

The genus contains two species:
Swallow-tailed hummingbird, Eupetomena macroura
Sombre hummingbird, Eupetomena cirrochloris 

The sombre hummingbird was formerly placed in the genus Aphantochroa but based primarily on a molecular phylogenetic study published in 2014, Aphantochroa has been merged into Eupetomena.

References

Eupetomena
Bird genera